The ISU Junior Grand Prix in Slovakia (sometimes titled Grand Prize SNP or Skate Slovakia) is an international figure skating competition. Sanctioned by the International Skating Union, it is held in the autumn in some years as part of the JGP series. Medals may be awarded in the disciplines of men's singles, ladies' singles, pair skating, and ice dancing.

Junior medalists

Men

Ladies

Pairs 

†Nagalati and Bobrov were later disqualified from the competition due to a positive doping sample from Nagalati.

Ice dancing

References

External links 
 Event website
 ISU Junior Grand Prix at the International Skating Union
 SLOVENSKÝ KRASOKORČULIARSKY ZVÄZ (Slovak Figure Skating Union) 

Slovakia
JGP